Brigadier General Giora "Hawkeye" Epstein (born May 20, 1938), today Giora Even, is a retired brigadier General in the Israeli Air Force (IAF) and a fighter ace credited with 17 victories, 16 against Egyptian jets and one against an Egyptian Mi-8 helicopter, making Epstein the ace of aces of supersonic fighter jets and of the Israeli Air Force.
Epstein was an active IAF pilot from 1961 until May 26, 1997, when he retired at age 59. Like many retired IAF flyers, he later worked as a pilot for El Al Airlines.

Early career 
Epstein joined the Israeli Defense Force (IDF) in 1956 during the Sinai War. He was initially rejected from flight school because of a heart condition and began his military career as a paratrooper. While traveling with the IDF's parachute demonstration team, Epstein changed his last name to Even ("stone" in Hebrew). He left the IDF in 1959 before returning two years later to again apply for flight school.

After gaining medical clearance (mostly through his own stubbornness), Epstein began fighter training. He soon gained the nickname "Hawkeye" due to his extraordinary eyesight. Epstein was allegedly able to spot aircraft at a distance of 24 miles (38,4 km) — nearly three times further than a normal pilot.

Victories: 1967–1973 

Epstein's first kill came on June 6, 1967 during the Six-Day War, when he downed an Egyptian Sukhoi-7 at El Arish. During the War of Attrition in 1969–70, Epstein downed a MiG-17, another Sukhoi-7 and two MiG 21s. The rest of his kills came during 1973's Yom Kippur War. Between October 18 and 20, 1973, he downed an Egyptian Mi-8 helicopter and eight jets: two Sukhoi-7s, two Sukhoi-20s and four MiG 21s. Then, on October 24, 1973, Epstein downed three more MiG-21s west of the Great Bitter Lake. Eight of these victories were with the French-built Mirage III, a delta wing fighter designed primarily as a high altitude interceptor. His other nine victories came in an IAI Nesher, an Israeli-built version of the Mirage 5. Five of his kills were downed using air-to-air missiles, the rest with cannon.

Later career and retirement 
After the Yom Kippur War, Epstein received the Medal of Distinguished Service, one of Israel's highest military honors. He went on to command Mirage and Kfir squadrons and was flying "ready" missions in the F-16 up until his 59th birthday. Epstein was a captain for El Al Airlines from 1977 to 1997.

Epstein was the primary subject of the "Desert Aces" episode of The History Channel series Dogfights. The episode first aired on August 10, 2007.

See also
 254 Squadron (Israel)
 101 Squadron (Israel)

References

External links
 Official Israeli Air Force site listing Epstein's victory details

1938 births
Living people
Israeli Jews
Israeli flying aces
Israeli Air Force personnel
Six-Day War pilots
Yom Kippur War pilots
Recipients of the Medal of Distinguished Service
Commercial aviators